"Before You" is a song by Canadian singer-songwriter Chantal Kreviazuk. It was released as the lead single from Kreviazuk's second studio album, Colour Moving and Still, on 7 September 1999. The song peaked at number two on the Canadian RPM Top Singles chart, behind "I Knew I Loved You" by Savage Garden, and is Kreviazuk's biggest hit in Canada to date. Kreviazuk performed the song live at the 2000 Juno Awards.

Background
Kreviazuk wrote the song several days before the recording of Colour Moving and Still. She explained, "We were in our third day of preproduction, and I was so bummed ... I wrote the song during that low point. It showed me that a creative low can bring something great out of you."

Charts

Weekly charts

Year-end charts

Release history

References

1999 singles
1999 songs
Chantal Kreviazuk songs
Columbia Records singles
Songs written by Chantal Kreviazuk
Songs written by Jay Joyce
Sony Music singles